Harttiella pilosa is a species of catfish in the family Loricariidae. It is native to South America, where it occurs in the Orapu River basin in the Tortue Mountains of French Guiana. The type locality of the species is the area directly upstream and downstream of a 30 m (98 ft) high waterfall. This environment is a 10 m (33 ft) wide river channel with shallow, clear water and a substrate composed of gravel, pebbles, boulders, bedrock, and iron-rich sand. The species reaches 4 cm (1.6 inches) in standard length. It was described in 2012 as part of a taxonomic review of members of the loricariid tribe Harttiini native to the Guianas.

References 

Fish described in 2012
Loricariidae
Catfish of South America
Fish of French Guiana